Sir Suba Shah  is a town in Manyanda Union Council of Kallar Syedan Tehsil in Rawalpindi District Punjab, Pakistan.

Geography

Kallar Syeda, the capital city is a main shopping center for the people.

The countryside surrounding the town is typical of the Potohar Plateau landscape. It is surrounded by several smaller towns along with the main towns: Choha Khalsa, Doberan Kallan, Kanoha and Samote. The fertile land of the Union Council Manyanda region grows crops such as wheat, corn and peanuts.

Language
 Pothwari language: 90%
 Urdu: 5%
 Pashto: 3%
 Other: 2%

Schools  
 Government Boys High School Sir Suba Shah, Manianda, Kallar Syedan

References

External links
http://www.cellsaa.com/post-code-area/SIR-SUBA-SHAH
http://wikimapia.org/5654480/Sir-Suba-Shah
https://www.paktive.com/maps/sir-suba-shah.html

Populated places in Kallar Syedan Tehsil
Towns in Kallar Syedan Tehsil